is a Japanese mecha animated film directed by Yoshikazu Yasuhiko. The film is based on the fifteenth episode of the television series Mobile Suit Gundam that suffered several animation issues as a result of poor outsourcing and Yasuhiko being hospitalized. Yasuhiko decided to remake the episode as a film due to his liking of the episode's original concept. The film is set in the One Year War, when Amuro Ray pilots the title Gundam mecha and is ordered alongside the White Base crew to search for Zeon stragglers on a remote island. It was released in Japan on June 3, 2022.

Plot 
The story is set after the Federation defense of Jaburo, with the Federation planning to renew offensives on Zeon's invasion headquarters in Odessa. Amuro and the White Base head to Belfast to resupply, but the White Base receives new orders: to head to the "Island of No Return" to search and destroy any Zeon stragglers.

The story begins with several Federal mobile suits fighting a losing battle against a single Zeonic Zaku, with several children watching from the sidelines.

Production

The film originated from the 15th episode of Mobile Suit Gundam. Director Yoshiyuki Tomino said the episode had so many mistakes that he wanted to skip it and never release it. This was mostly due to art director and character designer Yoshikazu Yasuhiko being hospitalized. Although the episode was never released in western territories, Sunrise often referenced it in different installments. Yasuhiko eventually revealed in the 2020s that the episode was also completely outsourced but still believed it had potential to tell a good story as a film. This studio that animated the episode was Anime Friend, a subsidiary of Tatsunoko Production that appeared in the credits of Cucuruz Doan's Island. Yasuhiko also omitted the story from his own manga that retells the anime, The Origin, but was still interested by its themes.

Tōru Furuya reprised his role of the protagonist Amuro Ray and did not express any struggle despite not having voiced him in decades. Shunsuke Takeuchi voiced the title character Cucuruz Doan; he noted Furuya was one of his inspirations when working as voice actor. In recording the movie, Yasuhiko commented that Takeuchi was cast late already by the time most of Furuya's lines were recorded. Upon being selected, Takeuchi was glad with taking the role. Several recasts had to be made for the White Base crew. Furuya was nostalgic about the role and stated that the film made emphasis of how clashing was the relationship between Amuro and his superior, Captain Bright Noa.

Due to the differences of demographics between the 1970s and the 2020s, the character of Bright Noa was redesigned as a more adult character rather than the young adult from the TV series. Yasuhiko considered the film's children to be actual protagonists. In casting the their voice actors, Yasuhiko aimed to make them noisy and separate them from the adult ones. The director wanted to prove that Japanese films could do better with child actors. Furuya elaborated that Yasuhiko's idea was making the movie realistic with Amuro acting more mature in relationship with the children. Another theme of the film was how the youth's lives are being ruined by the plot of the One Year War story from the original television series.

According to producer Naohiro Ogata, the film's elements are "anti-war" and "smaller battles". Although the episodes generally are 20 minutes long, the original story was expanded to 100 minutes which, according to Kawai, would surprise the audience. Kawai personally wanted the film to properly depict Amuro's mecha RX-78-02 Gundam in the same fashion as the original television series from 1978. The team asked Yamato Works to help with the CGI animation, while Sunrise's staff member Shuhei Morita instead wanted to use hand-drawn animation. Ogata suggested that depending on the film's success, he considered other episodes also being remade as films. The film was compared with Apocalypse Now by the director.

The film's theme song is "Ubugoe" by Hiroko Moriguchi.

Cast

The cast includes:
Cucuruz Doan – Shunsuke Takeuchi (Japanese); Mike Smith (English)
Amuro Ray – Tōru Furuya (Japanese); Lucien Dodge (English)
Egba Atler – Atsushi Miyauchi (Japanese); Gianni Matragrano (English)
Cara – Fu Hirohara (Japanese); Kimberly Woods (English)
Hayato Kobayashi – Hideki Nakanishi (Japanese); Kyle McCarley (English)
Johann Ibrahim Revil – Hiroshi Naka (Japanese); Jason Simon (English)
Elran – Hiroshi Shirokuma (Japanese); Mick Wingert (English)
Staff Officer – Katsuyuki Konishi (Japanese); Mick Wingert (English)
Bright Noa – Ken Narita (Japanese); Christopher Smith (English)
Yun Sanho – Koji Yusa (Japanese); Nicholas Andrew Louie (English)
Uragang – Makoto Yasumura (Japanese); David Jordan Chen (English)
Sayla Mass – Megumi Han (Japanese); Colleen O'Shaughnessey (English)
Fraw Bow – Misato Fukuen (Japanese); Alyson Leigh Rosenfeld (English)
Gopp – Naomi Kusumi (Japanese); Jason Simon (English)
Mirai Yashima – Satomi Arai (Japanese); Fryda Wolff (English)
Selma Livens – Shizuka Itou (Japanese); Dawn M. Bennett (English)
M'Quve – Takumi Yamazaki (Japanese); Ezra Weisz (English)
Sleggar Law – Tomofumi Ikezoe (Japanese); Eliah Mountjoy (English)
Kai Shiden – Toshio Furukawa (Japanese); Kevin T. Collins (English)
Waldo Ren – Yōji Ueda (Japanese); Crispin Freeman (English)
Marcos – Yūma Uchida (Japanese); Paul Castro Jr. (English)
Danan Rashica – Yuu Hayashi (Japanese); Andrew Kishino (English)

Release
Upon its release, the film made 300 million yen in Japan. It debuted third on its first weekend, reaching 400 million yen. It ended with 1.08 billion yen by the end of August. While the film was licensed by Crunchyroll for an English release, its debut in the United Kingdom was postponed for unspecified reasons.

The film's Blu-ray and DVD will be released in Japan on November 25, 2022. The limited edition includes the film's official soundtrack.

Reception
Anime News Network praised the movie for the focus on Amuro's character arc and modern themes without removing the original aspects of the franchise. Asian Anime Pulse also commented on the film positively for its handling of drama and animation, believing newcomers might enjoy it. The Japan Times commented that every viewer would be concerned by Amuro's safety due to how the main plot has him surviving the encounter from the original TV series but still felt returning fans would enjoy the story and how the disciplinary actions performed in White Base are contested.

Accolades

References

External links 

  
 

2022 anime films
Bandai Entertainment anime titles
Gundam anime and manga
Japanese animated films
Films set on fictional islands
Sunrise (company)